Lynch Cooper (c. 1905–1971) was an Aboriginal Australian sprinter who won the Stawell Gift in 1928 and the world's professional sprint championship competition in 1929.

He later become prominent in Aboriginal activism including as President of the Aboriginal Progressive Association in the 1940s.

Family
Cooper was born at Moira Lake near Tocumwal and was educated at Mulwala State School. His father was Aboriginal activist and community leader William Cooper.

Lynch Cooper married Eva Christian, daughter of Alfred William Christian and Annie Laid née Bruce, of Jeparit on 11 February 1939 at the Methodist Church, Footscray, Victoria.

References

Links
1933 - Wangaratta FC & Border United FC team photo
1934 - Wangaratta FC & Rutherglen FC team photos

Australian male sprinters
Indigenous Australian track and field athletes
Stawell Gift winners
1900s births
1971 deaths
Burials in Victoria (Australia)